Sergio Javier Goycochea (born 17 October 1963) is an Argentine former professional footballer who played as a goalkeeper. He is best known for helping his country reach the 1990 FIFA World Cup Final with his penalty kick saves.

Career
Goycochea was the substitute for Nery Pumpido both in River Plate and in the Argentina national team, and got his big break in the 1990 FIFA World Cup. When Pumpido broke his leg in Argentina's second group game against the Soviet Union, Goycochea stepped in and remained the team's starting goalkeeper for the remainder of the tournament. In the knockout stage, Goycochea effectively played a huge part in keeping Argentina in the tournament; he kept a clean sheet in the 1–0 Second Round victory over Brazil and saved penalties in the quarter-final and semi-final penalty shootout victories against Yugoslavia and Italy. He was also close to saving the game-winning penalty kick from Andreas Brehme at the 1990 World Cup final against Germany, which Argentina lost 1–0. He was chosen as the goalkeeper of the Cup's All-Star Team. Reflecting on the 1990 tournament, Goycochea told FIFA.com “To my mind, it was as if we were world champions again anyway”. 

El Goyco also played a few months in 1991 for the team Stade Brestois 29 from Brest in the region of Brittany, which was then named Brest Armorique, and was in the French second division and included players David Ginola, Corentin Martins and Stéphane Guivarc'h. Nonetheless, the team went bankrupt in November of that year, and was moved to the third division and lost its professional-team status.

With the national team, Goycochea also won the 1991 Copa América, 1992 FIFA Confederations Cup, 1993 Artemio Franchi Trophy, and 1993 Copa América. On the occasion of that 1993 Copa América tournament, Goycochea appeared on TV commercials for a Pepsi promotion by PepsiCo's division in Guayaquil. He also was on TV commercials for Adidas soccer apparel some years later.

His last name, Goycochea, spelled without e, but which other people of the same genealogy spell as Goycoechea, is derived from the Basque surname Goikoetxea meaning  topmost house (from goiko "of the top" and etxe "house"). Sergio is frequently nicknamed thus El Vasco, but also El Goyco.

Goycochea is a football journalist hosting Elegante Sport (Argentina's Canal 7) and has partnered with Diego Maradona at La noche del Diez.

Career statistics

International
Source:

Honours

Club
River Plate
Argentine Primera División: 1985–86, 1993 Apertura
Copa Interamericana: 1986
Intercontinental Cup: 1986

Millonarios
Campeonato Colombiano: 1988

International
Argentina
Copa América: 1991, 1993
FIFA Confederations Cup: 1992
Artemio Franchi Cup: 1993
FIFA World Cup runner-up: 1990

Individual
FIFA World Cup All-Star Team: 1990
Footballer of the Year of Argentina: 1990
FIFA XI: 1991
IFFHS World's Best Goalkeeper (2): Silver ball 1991, 1993
South American Team of the Year (2): 1992, 1993
Copa América player of the tournament: 1993

See also
 List of expatriate footballers in Paraguay
 Players and Records in Paraguayan Football

References

External links

 Futbol Factory profile (Archived) 
 Argentine Primera statistics at Fútbol XXI 
 Interview to Sergio Goycochea – Diagonal 
 Globo Esporte's Futpédia entry 

1963 births
Living people
Argentine footballers
Argentine people of Basque descent
Argentine expatriate footballers
Argentina youth international footballers
Argentina under-20 international footballers
Argentina international footballers
1990 FIFA World Cup players
1994 FIFA World Cup players
1992 King Fahd Cup players
1987 Copa América players
1991 Copa América players
1993 Copa América players
Copa América-winning players
Copa Libertadores-winning players
FIFA Confederations Cup-winning players
Association football goalkeepers
Newell's Old Boys footballers
Racing Club de Avellaneda footballers
Stade Brestois 29 players
Club Atlético River Plate footballers
Millonarios F.C. players
Deportivo Mandiyú footballers
Sport Club Internacional players
Club Atlético Vélez Sarsfield footballers
Club Olimpia footballers
Cerro Porteño players
Sportspeople from Buenos Aires Province
Argentine television personalities
Argentine journalists
Male journalists
Expatriate footballers in France
Expatriate footballers in Brazil
Expatriate footballers in Colombia
Expatriate footballers in Paraguay
Argentine Primera División players
Categoría Primera A players
Paraguayan Primera División players
Argentine expatriate sportspeople in Brazil
Argentine expatriate sportspeople in France
Argentine expatriate sportspeople in Colombia
Argentine expatriate sportspeople in Paraguay